Amy Lee is an American singer-songwriter and classically–trained pianist, co-founder and lead vocalist of the rock band Evanescence.

Amy Lee may also refer to:

Ailee (stage name),  American-born singer based in South Korea
Amy Lee (saxophonist), American saxophonist, composer and arranger
Amy Grant, American singer-songwriter, musician, author, media personality and actress
Amy Freeman Lee (1914-2004), American artist, writer and lecturer
Amy Lee of the Canadian clown duo Morro and Jasp

See also 

 Amy Fee